Pseudobartsia is a monotypic genus of flowering plants belonging to the family Orobanchaceae. The only species is Pseudobartsia glandulosa.

Its native range is Eastern Himalaya to Southern Central China.

References

Orobanchaceae
Orobanchaceae genera
Monotypic Lamiales genera